Prilly Latuconsina (born October 15, 1996) is an Indonesian actress, host, and singer. She is known for her leading roles in the television dramas Hanya Kamu, Monyet Cantik 2, and Ganteng Ganteng Serigala. She is an actress, known for Surat Untukmu (2016), Hangout (2016), Danur: I Can See Ghosts (2017), Danur 2: Maddah (2018), Honeymoon (2013) and La tahzan (2013).

Early life
Prilly Latuconsina was born on born October 15, 1996, in Tangerang, Banten. Her father is a Muslim Moluccans, native of Pelauw in Haruku Island of Maluku Province and Pakistani, while her mother is Pandeglang and Sundanese. Prilly made her entertainment debut when she was the Master of Ceremonies in Koki Cilik.

Career
She gained popularity through her appearance in the soap opera Get Married: The Series. In 2012, she starred in a television film. Her fame came when she played a sissy character with the greeting "OMG Hellooo" in the drama Ganteng Ganteng Serigala. For her acting in Ganteng Ganteng Serigala, Prilly received two awards: "Most Famous Actress" award at the 2014 SCTV Awards and "Favorite Actress" award at the 2015 Panasonic Gobel Awards.

Prilly is also a singer. Her debut single was "Fall In Love" in 2014. In 2015, she released a new single named "Sahabat Hidup". On March 9, 2016, the day when GMT (Total Solar Eclipse) was observed, Latuconsina released her debut album, Sahabat Hidup, which was only sold in KFC stores across Indonesia.

In 2015, she won the following awards: "Exist Celeb" at the 2015 Selebrita Awards, "Most Inbox Female Solo Singer" and "Most Inbox Guest Host" at the 2015 Inbox Awards, and "Most Exist Social Media Celebrity".

Discography

Studio album
 Sahabat Hidup (2016)

Singles

Filmography

Film

Television

Television film

Books
 Prilly Latuconsina (2017). 5 Detik dan Rasa Rindu(5 seconds and Nostalgia). Published February 2017 by Mizan Publishing.

Awards and nominations

References

External links
 
 
 
 
 
 

Indonesian actresses
Indonesian film actresses
Moluccan people
People from Tangerang
Indonesian people of Pakistani descent
Indonesian Muslims
Sundanese people
Indonesian singers
21st-century Indonesian women singers
1996 births
Living people